Jocara olivescens is a species of snout moth first described by Herbert Druce in 1902. It is found in South America, including Colombia.

References

Moths described in 1902
Jocara